Anant Surendraray Dave (5 December 1957 – 5 October 2020) was an Indian judge who served as Acting Chief Justice and also as Judge of the Gujarat High Court.

Career 
Dave was born in 1957 in a tribal village of Panchmahal District, Indian State of Gujarat. He completed his primary and secondary education in village schools. He stood First Class in S.S.C. Examination and passed B.Com with LL.B. in First Division. Dave was awarded with coveted M.S. Pandit Gold Medal in the subject of Jurisprudence. On 30 December 1984 he was enrolled as an Advocate in Bar Council of Gujarat High Court. He served as Government Panel lawyer and also worked as Standing Counsel, Additional Government Pleader in the High Court. Dave also appeared in various Tribunals on behalf of the Government of Gujarat. He was elevated in the post of additional Judge of Gujarat High Court on 8 October 2004 and became permanent Judge on 25 September 2006. Justice Dave was appointed as the Acting Chief Justice of High Court of Gujarat on 14 November 2018.

He died on 5 October 2020, aged 62.

References 

1957 births
2020 deaths
21st-century Indian judges
21st-century Indian lawyers
Indian judges
Judges of the Gujarat High Court
Chief Justices of the Gujarat High Court
People from Panchmahal district